Pua'a-2 Agricultural Fields Archeological District is a historic site of Ancient Hawaii agriculture on the Big Island of Hawaii.

The site
Coordinates are approximate; it is within the Ahupuaa of Puaa 2, on a  Kona coffee farm known as Ariana Farms Ono Coffee.
A 1985 survey found several stone platforms, several agricultural terraces, and a 50 by  feature thought to be an agricultural heiau.

The site is state archaeological site number 10-28-10,229 (the last part of this site designation, plus "50HA" to indicate the state of Hawaii, was appended to its name on the National registry). It was added to the National Register of Historic Places on October 14, 1986, as site number 86002804.

Severe damage in 2000
The site was damaged and possibly destroyed in 2000 when a permit was mistakenly given to clear the area for planting coffee. The State Historic Preservation District officials approve each grading permit, but with several vacancies for archaeologists in the district, the property owners were not aware of any site on their property.

References

Archaeological sites in Hawaii
Geography of Hawaii (island)
Agriculture in Hawaii
Archaeological sites on the National Register of Historic Places in Hawaii
Heiau
Protected areas of Hawaii (island)
Protected areas established in 1986
1986 establishments in Hawaii
Historic districts on the National Register of Historic Places in Hawaii